OWU may refer to:

Educational Institutions 
 Ohio Wesleyan University in Delaware, Ohio, United States
 Oklahoma Wesleyan University in Bartlesville, Oklahoma, United States

Other uses 
 George Owu (born 1982), Ghanaian football player
 Owu Kingdom, of the Egba people of Nigeria